Quazi Syque Caesar (born August 22, 1990) is a former artistic gymnast and current coach.  He represented Bangladesh at the 2012 Summer Olympics in London and was a captain of the Michigan Wolverines men's gymnastics team. He was an assistant coach for the Stanford Cardinal men's gymnastics team for over six years, was the head coach for the men's gymnastics athlete resident program at the U.S. Olympic & Paralympic Training Center until its dissolution in 2022, and is currently coaching at EVO Gymnastics.

Early life
Caesar was born in Florida, the son of immigrants from Bangladesh.  Raised in Port Saint Lucie, Florida, Caesar enrolled at the University of Michigan in 2008.  He was a member of the Michigan Wolverines men's gymnastics team from 2009 to 2012.  As a sophomore in 2010, he helped lead Michigan to the NCAA team championship.  As a junior in 2011, he was elected co-captain of the Michigan men's gymnastic team and won the Big Ten Conference championship in the parallel bars.

Accomplishments
Caesar holds dual U.S. and Bangladesh citizenship and has represented Bangladesh in international competition.  At the Central South Asian Artistic Gymnastic Championships in December 2011, Caesar competed for Bangladesh and won the parallel bars event—the first gold medal for Bangladesh in international competition.  He also won the silver medal in the vault and the bronze medals in the floor event and all-around competition.  He was dubbed "Golden Syque" in The Daily Star, Bangladesh's largest English-language newspaper.

In April 2012, Caesar was chosen to represent Bangladesh at the 2012 Summer Olympics in London.  There he had hopes to end Bangladesh's distinction as the most populous nation never to have won a medal at the Olympic Games.  Caesar's roommate and Michigan teammate, Sam Mikulak, was also chosen to compete in the 2012 Olympics, representing the United States.  Caesar also competed at the 2014 Commonwealth Games.

In late 2021 Caesar was named head coach for the men's gymnastics athlete resident program at the U.S. Olympic & Paralympic Training Center.

Competitive history

References

External links
 

1990 births
Living people
American people of Bangladeshi descent
American male artistic gymnasts
Michigan Wolverines men's gymnasts
Bangladeshi male artistic gymnasts
Gymnasts at the 2012 Summer Olympics
Olympic gymnasts of Bangladesh
Commonwealth Games competitors for Bangladesh
Gymnasts at the 2014 Commonwealth Games
Gymnasts at the 2014 Asian Games
Asian Games competitors for Bangladesh